Attila, frequently called Attila the Hun, was the ruler of the Huns from 434 until his death in March 453. He was also the leader of a tribal empire consisting of Huns, Ostrogoths, Alans, and Bulgars, among others, in Central and Eastern Europe.

During his reign, he was one of the most feared enemies of the Western and Eastern Roman Empires. He crossed the Danube twice and plundered the Balkans, but was unable to take Constantinople. His unsuccessful campaign in Persia was followed in 441 by an invasion of the Eastern Roman (Byzantine) Empire, the success of which emboldened Attila to invade the West. He also attempted to conquer Roman Gaul (modern France), crossing the Rhine in 451 and marching as far as Aurelianum (Orléans), before being stopped in the Battle of the Catalaunian Plains.

He subsequently invaded Italy, devastating the northern provinces, but was unable to take Rome. He planned for further campaigns against the Romans, but died in 453. After Attila's death, his close adviser, Ardaric of the Gepids, led a Germanic revolt against Hunnic rule, after which the Hunnic Empire quickly collapsed. Attila lived on as a character in Germanic heroic legend.

Etymology 

Many scholars have argued that the name Attila derives from East Germanic origin; Attila is formed from the Gothic or Gepidic noun atta, "father", by means of the diminutive suffix -ila, meaning "little father", compare Wulfila from wulfs "wolf" and -ila, i.e. "little wolf". The Gothic etymology was first proposed by Jacob and Wilhelm Grimm in the early 19th century. Maenchen-Helfen notes that this derivation of the name "offers neither phonetic nor semantic difficulties", and Gerhard Doerfer notes that the name is simply correct Gothic. Alexander Savelyev and Choongwon Jeong (2020) similarly state that Attila's name "must have been Gothic in origin." The name has sometimes been interpreted as a Germanization of a name of Hunnic origin.

Other scholars have argued for a Turkic origin of the name. Omeljan Pritsak considered Ἀττίλα (Attíla) a composite title-name which derived from Turkic *es (great, old), and *til (sea, ocean), and the suffix /a/. The stressed back syllabic til assimilated the front member es, so it became *as. It is a nominative, in form of attíl- (< *etsíl < *es tíl) with the meaning "the oceanic, universal ruler". J. J. Mikkola connected it with Turkic āt (name, fame).

As another Turkic possibility, H. Althof (1902) considered it was related to Turkish atli (horseman, cavalier), or Turkish at (horse) and dil (tongue). Maenchen-Helfen argues that Pritsak's derivation is "ingenious but for many reasons unacceptable", while dismissing Mikkola's as "too farfetched to be taken seriously". M. Snædal similarly notes that none of these proposals has achieved wide acceptance.

Criticizing the proposals of finding Turkic or other etymologies for Attila, Doerfer notes that King George VI of the United Kingdom had a name of Greek origin, and Süleyman the Magnificent had a name of Arabic origin, yet that does not make them Greeks or Arabs: it is therefore plausible that Attila would have a name not of Hunnic origin. Historian Hyun Jin Kim, however, has argued that the Turkic etymology is "more probable".

M. Snædal, in a paper that rejects the Germanic derivation but notes the problems with the existing proposed Turkic etymologies, argues that Attila's name could have originated from Turkic-Mongolian at, adyy/agta (gelding, warhorse) and Turkish atlı (horseman, cavalier), meaning "possessor of geldings, provider of warhorses".

Historiography and source 

The historiography of Attila is faced with a major challenge, in that the only complete sources are written in Greek and Latin by the enemies of the Huns. Attila's contemporaries left many testimonials of his life, but only fragments of these remain. Priscus was a Byzantine diplomat and historian who wrote in Greek, and he was both a witness to and an actor in the story of Attila, as a member of the embassy of Theodosius II at the Hunnic court in 449. He was obviously biased by his political position, but his writing is a major source for information on the life of Attila, and he is the only person known to have recorded a physical description of him. He wrote a history of the late Roman Empire in eight books covering the period from 430 to 476.

Only fragments of Priscus' work remain. It was cited extensively by 6th-century historians Procopius and Jordanes, especially in Jordanes' The Origin and Deeds of the Goths, which contains numerous references to Priscus's history, and it is also an important source of information about the Hunnic empire and its neighbors. He describes the legacy of Attila and the Hunnic people for a century after Attila's death. Marcellinus Comes, a chancellor of Justinian during the same era, also describes the relations between the Huns and the Eastern Roman Empire.

Numerous ecclesiastical writings contain useful but scattered information, sometimes difficult to authenticate or distorted by years of hand-copying between the 6th and 17th centuries. The Hungarian writers of the 12th century wished to portray the Huns in a positive light as their glorious ancestors, and so repressed certain historical elements and added their own legends.

The literature and knowledge of the Huns themselves was transmitted orally, by means of epics and chanted poems that were handed down from generation to generation. Indirectly, fragments of this oral history have reached us via the literature of the Scandinavians and Germans, neighbors of the Huns who wrote between the 9th and 13th centuries. Attila is a major character in many Medieval epics, such as the Nibelungenlied, as well as various Eddas and sagas.

Archaeological investigation has uncovered some details about the lifestyle, art, and warfare of the Huns. There are a few traces of battles and sieges, but the tomb of Attila and the location of his capital have not yet been found.

Early life and background 

The Huns were a group of Eurasian nomads, appearing from east of the Volga, who migrated further into Western Europe c. 370 and built up an enormous empire there. Their main military techniques were mounted archery and javelin throwing. They were in the process of developing settlements before their arrival in Western Europe, yet the Huns were a society of pastoral warriors whose primary form of nourishment was meat and milk, products of their herds.

The origin and language of the Huns has been the subject of debate for centuries. According to some theories, their leaders at least may have spoken a Turkic language, perhaps closest to the modern Chuvash language. One scholar suggests a relationship to the Xiongnu via Yeniseian. According to the Encyclopedia of European Peoples, "the Huns, especially those who migrated to the west, may have been a combination of central Asian Turkic, Mongolic, and Ugric stocks".

Attila's father Mundzuk was the brother of kings Octar and Ruga, who reigned jointly over the Hunnic empire in the early fifth century. This form of diarchy was recurrent with the Huns, but historians are unsure whether it was institutionalized, merely customary, or an occasional occurrence. His family was from a noble lineage, but it is uncertain whether they constituted a royal dynasty. Attila's birthdate is debated; journalist Éric Deschodt and writer Herman Schreiber have proposed a date of 395. However, historian Iaroslav Lebedynsky and archaeologist Katalin Escher prefer an estimate between the 390s and the first decade of the fifth century. Several historians have proposed 406 as the date.

Attila grew up in a rapidly changing world. His people were nomads who had only recently arrived in Europe. They crossed the Volga river during the 370s and annexed the territory of the Alans, then attacked the Gothic kingdom between the Carpathian mountains and the Danube. They were a very mobile people, whose mounted archers had acquired a reputation for invincibility, and the Germanic tribes seemed unable to withstand them. Vast populations fleeing the Huns moved from Germania into the Roman Empire in the west and south, and along the banks of the Rhine and Danube. In 376, the Goths crossed the Danube, initially submitting to the Romans but soon rebelling against Emperor Valens, whom they killed in the Battle of Adrianople in 378. Large numbers of Vandals, Alans, Suebi, and Burgundians crossed the Rhine and invaded Roman Gaul on December 31, 406 to escape the Huns. The Roman Empire had been split in half since 395 and was ruled by two distinct governments, one based in Ravenna in the West, and the other in Constantinople in the East. The Roman Emperors, both East and West, were generally from the Theodosian family in Attila's lifetime (despite several power struggles).

The Huns dominated a vast territory with nebulous borders determined by the will of a constellation of ethnically varied peoples. Some were assimilated to Hunnic nationality, whereas many retained their own identities and rulers but acknowledged the suzerainty of the king of the Huns. The Huns were also the indirect source of many of the Romans' problems, driving various Germanic tribes into Roman territory, yet relations between the two empires were cordial: the Romans used the Huns as mercenaries against the Germans and even in their civil wars. Thus, the usurper Joannes was able to recruit thousands of Huns for his army against Valentinian III in 424. It was Aëtius, later Patrician of the West, who managed this operation. They exchanged ambassadors and hostages, the alliance lasting from 401 to 450 and permitting the Romans numerous military victories. The Huns considered the Romans to be paying them tribute, whereas the Romans preferred to view this as payment for services rendered. The Huns had become a great power by the time that Attila came of age during the reign of his uncle Ruga, to the point that Nestorius, the Patriarch of Constantinople, deplored the situation with these words: "They have become both masters and slaves of the Romans".

Campaigns against the Eastern Roman Empire 

The death of Rugila (also known as Rua or Ruga) in 434 left the sons of his brother Mundzuk, Attila and Bleda, in control of the united Hun tribes. At the time of the two brothers' accession, the Hun tribes were bargaining with Eastern Roman Emperor Theodosius II's envoys for the return of several renegades who had taken refuge within the Eastern Roman Empire, possibly Hunnic nobles who disagreed with the brothers' assumption of leadership.

The following year, Attila and Bleda met with the imperial legation at Margus (Požarevac), all seated on horseback in the Hunnic manner, and negotiated an advantageous treaty. The Romans agreed to return the fugitives, to double their previous tribute of 350 Roman pounds (c. 115 kg) of gold, to open their markets to Hunnish traders, and to pay a ransom of eight solidi for each Roman taken prisoner by the Huns. The Huns, satisfied with the treaty, decamped from the Roman Empire and returned to their home in the Great Hungarian Plain, perhaps to consolidate and strengthen their empire. Theodosius used this opportunity to strengthen the walls of Constantinople, building the city's first sea wall, and to build up his border defenses along the Danube.

The Huns remained out of Roman sight for the next few years while they invaded the Sassanid Empire. They were defeated in Armenia by the Sassanids, abandoned their invasion, and turned their attentions back to Europe. In 440, they reappeared in force on the borders of the Roman Empire, attacking the merchants at the market on the north bank of the Danube that had been established by the treaty of 435.

Crossing the Danube, they laid waste to the cities of Illyricum and forts on the river, including (according to Priscus) Viminacium, a city of Moesia. Their advance began at Margus, where they demanded that the Romans turn over a bishop who had retained property that Attila regarded as his. While the Romans discussed the bishop's fate, he slipped away secretly to the Huns and betrayed the city to them.

While the Huns attacked city-states along the Danube, the Vandals (led by Geiseric) captured the Western Roman province of Africa and its capital of Carthage. Africa was the richest province of the Western Empire and a main source of food for Rome. The Sassanid Shah Yazdegerd II invaded Armenia in 441.

The Romans stripped the Balkan area of forces, sending them to Sicily in order to mount an expedition against the Vandals in Africa. This left Attila and Bleda a clear path through Illyricum into the Balkans, which they invaded in 441. The Hunnish army sacked Margus and Viminacium, and then took Singidunum (Belgrade) and Sirmium. During 442, Theodosius recalled his troops from Sicily and ordered a large issue of new coins to finance operations against the Huns. He believed that he could defeat the Huns and refused the Hunnish kings' demands.

Attila responded with a campaign in 443. For the first time (as far as the Romans knew) his forces were equipped with battering rams and rolling siege towers, with which they successfully assaulted the military centers of Ratiara and Naissus (Niš) and massacred the inhabitants. Priscus said "When we arrived at Naissus we found the city deserted, as though it had been sacked; only a few sick persons lay in the churches. We halted at a short distance from the river, in an open space, for all the ground adjacent to the bank was full of the bones of men slain in war."

Advancing along the Nišava River, the Huns next took Serdica (Sofia), Philippopolis (Plovdiv), and Arcadiopolis (Lüleburgaz). They encountered and destroyed a Roman army outside Constantinople but were stopped by the double walls of the Eastern capital. They defeated a second army near Callipolis (Gelibolu).

Theodosius, unable to make effective armed resistance, admitted defeat, sending the Magister militum per Orientem Anatolius to negotiate peace terms. The terms were harsher than the previous treaty: the Emperor agreed to hand over 6,000 Roman pounds (c. 2000 kg) of gold as punishment for having disobeyed the terms of the treaty during the invasion; the yearly tribute was tripled, rising to 2,100 Roman pounds (c. 700 kg) in gold; and the ransom for each Roman prisoner rose to 12 solidi.

Their demands were met for a time, and the Hun kings withdrew into the interior of their empire.  Bleda died following the Huns' withdrawal from Byzantium (probably around 445). Attila then took the throne for himself, becoming the sole ruler of the Huns.

Solitary kingship 
In 447, Attila again rode south into the Eastern Roman Empire through Moesia. The Roman army, under Gothic magister militum Arnegisclus, met him in the Battle of the Utus and was defeated, though not without inflicting heavy losses. The Huns were left unopposed and rampaged through the Balkans as far as Thermopylae.

Constantinople itself was saved by the Isaurian troops of magister militum per Orientem Zeno and protected by the intervention of prefect Constantinus, who organized the reconstruction of the walls that had been previously damaged by earthquakes and, in some places, to construct a new line of fortification in front of the old. Callinicus, in his Life of Saint Hypatius, wrote:

In the west 

In 450, Attila proclaimed his intent to attack the Visigoth kingdom of Toulouse by making an alliance with Emperor Valentinian III. He had previously been on good terms with the Western Roman Empire and its influential general Flavius Aëtius. Aëtius had spent a brief exile among the Huns in 433, and the troops that Attila provided against the Goths and Bagaudae had helped earn him the largely honorary title of magister militum in the west. The gifts and diplomatic efforts of Geiseric, who opposed and feared the Visigoths, may also have influenced Attila's plans.

However, Valentinian's sister was Honoria, who had sent the Hunnish king a plea for help—and her engagement ring—in order to escape her forced betrothal to a Roman senator in the spring of 450. Honoria may not have intended a proposal of marriage, but Attila chose to interpret her message as such. He accepted, asking for half of the western Empire as dowry.

When Valentinian discovered the plan, only the influence of his mother Galla Placidia convinced him to exile Honoria, rather than killing her. He also wrote to Attila, strenuously denying the legitimacy of the supposed marriage proposal. Attila sent an emissary to Ravenna to proclaim that Honoria was innocent, that the proposal had been legitimate, and that he would come to claim what was rightfully his.

Attila interfered in a succession struggle after the death of a Frankish ruler. Attila supported the elder son, while Aëtius supported the younger. (The location and identity of these kings is not known and subject to conjecture.) Attila gathered his vassals—Gepids, Ostrogoths, Rugians, Scirians, Heruls, Thuringians, Alans, Burgundians, among others—and began his march west. In 451, he arrived in Belgica with an army exaggerated by Jordanes to half a million strong.

On April 7, he captured Metz. Other cities attacked can be determined by the hagiographic vitae written to commemorate their bishops: Nicasius was slaughtered before the altar of his church in Rheims; Servatus is alleged to have saved Tongeren with his prayers, as Saint Genevieve is said to have saved Paris. Lupus, bishop of Troyes, is also credited with saving his city by meeting Attila in person.

Aëtius moved to oppose Attila, gathering troops from among the Franks, the Burgundians, and the Celts. A mission by Avitus and Attila's continued westward advance convinced the Visigoth king Theodoric I (Theodorid) to ally with the Romans. The combined armies reached Orléans ahead of Attila, thus checking and turning back the Hunnish advance. Aëtius gave chase and caught the Huns at a place usually assumed to be near Catalaunum (modern Châlons-en-Champagne). Attila decided to fight the Romans on plains where he could use his cavalry.

The two armies clashed in the Battle of the Catalaunian Plains, the outcome of which is commonly considered to be a strategic victory for the Visigothic-Roman alliance. Theodoric was killed in the fighting, and Aëtius failed to press his advantage, according to Edward Gibbon and Edward Creasy, because he feared the consequences of an overwhelming Visigothic triumph as much as he did a defeat. From Aëtius' point of view, the best outcome was what occurred: Theodoric died, Attila was in retreat and disarray, and the Romans had the benefit of appearing victorious.

Invasion of Italy and death 

Attila returned in 452 to renew his marriage claim with Honoria, invading and ravaging Italy along the way. Communities became established in what would later become Venice as a result of these attacks when the residents fled to small islands in the Venetian Lagoon. His army sacked numerous cities and razed Aquileia so completely that it was afterwards hard to recognize its original site. Aëtius lacked the strength to offer battle, but managed to harass and slow Attila's advance with only a shadow force. Attila finally halted at the River Po. By this point, disease and starvation may have taken hold in Attila's camp, thus hindering his war efforts and potentially contributing to the cessation of invasion.

Emperor Valentinian III sent three envoys, the high civilian officers Gennadius Avienus and Trigetius, as well as the Bishop of Rome Leo I, who met Attila at Mincio in the vicinity of Mantua and obtained from him the promise that he would withdraw from Italy and negotiate peace with the Emperor. Prosper of Aquitaine gives a short description of the historic meeting, but gives all the credit to Leo for the successful negotiation. Priscus reports that superstitious fear of the fate of Alaric gave him pause—as Alaric died shortly after sacking Rome in 410.

Italy had suffered from a terrible famine in 451 and her crops were faring little better in 452. Attila's devastating invasion of the plains of northern Italy this year did not improve the harvest. To advance on Rome would have required supplies which were not available in Italy, and taking the city would not have improved Attila's supply situation. Therefore, it was more profitable for Attila to conclude peace and retreat to his homeland.

Furthermore, an East Roman force had crossed the Danube under the command of another officer also named Aetius—who had participated in the Council of Chalcedon the previous year—and proceeded to defeat the Huns who had been left behind by Attila to safeguard their home territories. Attila, hence, faced heavy human and natural pressures to retire "from Italy without ever setting foot south of the Po". As Hydatius writes in his Chronica Minora:

Death

In the Eastern Roman Empire, Emperor Marcian succeeded Theodosius II, and stopped paying tribute to the Huns. Attila withdrew from Italy to his palace across the Danube, while making plans to strike at Constantinople once more to reclaim tribute. 

However, he died in the early months of 453.

The conventional account from Priscus says that Attila was at a feast celebrating his latest marriage, this time to the beautiful young Ildico (the name suggests Gothic or Ostrogoth origins). In the midst of the revels, however, he suffered severe bleeding and died. He may have had a nosebleed and choked to death in a stupor. Or he may have succumbed to internal bleeding, possibly due to ruptured esophageal varices. Esophageal varices are dilated veins that form in the lower part of the esophagus, often caused by years of excessive alcohol consumption; they are fragile and can easily rupture, leading to death by hemorrhage.

Another account of his death was first recorded 80 years after the events by Roman chronicler Marcellinus Comes. It reports that "Attila, King of the Huns and ravager of the provinces of Europe, was pierced by the hand and blade of his wife". One modern analyst suggests that he was assassinated, but most reject these accounts as no more than hearsay, preferring instead the account given by Attila's contemporary Priscus, recounted in the 6th century by Jordanes:

Descendants

Attila's sons Ellac, Dengizich and Ernak, "in their rash eagerness to rule they all alike destroyed his empire". They "were clamoring that the nations should be divided among them equally and that warlike kings with their peoples should be apportioned to them by lot like a family estate". Against the treatment as "slaves of the basest condition" a Germanic alliance led by the Gepid ruler Ardaric (who was noted for great loyalty to Attila) revolted and fought with the Huns in Pannonia in the Battle of Nedao 454 AD. Attila's eldest son Ellac was killed in that battle. Attila's sons "regarding the Goths as deserters from their rule, came against them as though they were seeking fugitive slaves", attacked Ostrogothic co-ruler Valamir (who also fought alongside Ardaric and Attila at the Catalaunian Plains), but were repelled, and some group of Huns moved to Scythia (probably those of Ernak). His brother Dengizich attempted a renewed invasion across the Danube in 468 AD, but was defeated at the Battle of Bassianae by the Ostrogoths. Dengizich was killed by Roman-Gothic general Anagast the following year, after which the Hunnic dominion ended.

Attila's many children and relatives are known by name and some even by deeds, but soon valid genealogical sources all but dried up, and there seems to be no verifiable way to trace Attila's descendants. This has not stopped many genealogists from attempting to reconstruct a valid line of descent for various medieval rulers. One of the most credible claims has been that of the Nominalia of the Bulgarian khans for mythological Avitohol and Irnik from the Dulo clan of the Bulgars.

Appearance and character 

There is no surviving first-hand account of Attila's appearance, but there is a possible second-hand source provided by Jordanes, who cites a description given by Priscus.

Some scholars have suggested that these features are typically East Asian, because in combination they fit the physical type of people from Eastern Asia, so Attila's ancestors may have come from there. Other historians have suggested that the same features may have been typical of some Scythian people.

Later folklore and iconography 

The name has many variants in several languages: Atli and Atle in Old Norse; Etzel in Middle High German (Nibelungenlied); Ætla in Old English; Attila, Atilla, and Etele in Hungarian (Attila is the most popular); Attila, Atilla, Atilay, or Atila in Turkish; and Adil and Edil in Kazakh or Adil ("same/similar") or Edil ("to use") in Mongolian.

Legends about Attila and the sword of Mars 
Jordanes embellished the report of Priscus, reporting that Attila had possessed the "Holy War Sword of the Scythians", which was given to him by Mars and made him a "prince of the entire world".

By the end of the 12th century the royal court of Hungary proclaimed their descent from Attila. Lampert of Hersfeld's contemporary chronicles report that shortly before the year 1071, the Sword of Attila had been presented to Otto of Nordheim by the exiled queen of Hungary, Anastasia of Kiev. This sword, a cavalry sabre now in the Kunsthistorisches Museum in Vienna, appears to be the work of Hungarian goldsmiths of the ninth or tenth century.

Legends about Attila and his meeting with pope Leo I  
An anonymous chronicler of the medieval period represented the meeting of Pope Leo and Atilla as attended also by Saint Peter and Saint Paul, "a miraculous tale calculated to meet the taste of the time" This apotheosis was later portrayed artistically by the Renaissance artist Raphael and sculptor Algardi, whom eighteenth-century historian Edward Gibbon praised for establishing "one of the noblest legends of ecclesiastical tradition".

According to a version of this narrative related in the Chronicon Pictum, a mediaeval Hungarian chronicle, the Pope promised Attila that if he left Rome in peace, one of his successors would receive a holy crown (which has been understood as referring to the Holy Crown of Hungary).

Attila in Germanic heroic legend 
Some histories and chronicles describe Attila as a great and noble king, and he plays major roles in three Norse texts: Atlakviða, Volsunga saga, and Atlamál. The Polish Chronicle represents Attila's name as Aquila.

Frutolf of Michelsberg and Otto of Freising pointed out that some songs as "vulgar fables" and made Theoderic the Great, Attila and Ermanaric contemporaries, when any reader of Jordanes knew that this was not the case. This refers to the so-called historical poems about Dietrich von Bern (Theoderic), in which Etzel (German for Attila) is Dietrich's refuge in exile from his wicked uncle Ermenrich (Ermanaric). Etzel is most prominent in the poems Dietrichs Flucht and the Rabenschlacht. Etzel also appears as Kriemhild's second noble husband in the Nibelungenlied, in which Kriemhild causes the destruction of both the Hunnish kingdom and that of her Burgundian relatives.

Early modern and modern reception 
In 1812, Ludwig van Beethoven conceived the idea of writing an opera about Attila and approached August von Kotzebue to write the libretto. It was, however, never written. In 1846, Giuseppe Verdi wrote the opera, loosely based on episodes in Attila's invasion of Italy.

In World War I, Allied propaganda referred to Germans as the "Huns", based on a 1900 speech by Emperor Wilhelm II praising Attila the Hun's military prowess, according to Jawaharlal Nehru's Glimpses of World History. Der Spiegel commented on 6 November 1948, that the Sword of Attila was hanging menacingly over Austria.

American writer Cecelia Holland wrote The Death of Attila (1973), a historical novel in which Attila appears as a powerful background figure whose life and death deeply affect the protagonists, a young Hunnic warrior and a Germanic one.

In modern Hungary and in Turkey, "Attila" and its Turkish variation "Atilla" are commonly used as a male first name. In Hungary, several public places are named after Attila; for instance, in Budapest there are 10 Attila Streets, one of which is an important street behind the Buda Castle. When the Turkish Armed Forces invaded Cyprus in 1974, the operations were named after Attila ("The Attila Plan").

The 1954 Universal International film Sign of the Pagan starred Jack Palance as Attila.

Depictions of Attila

See also

 Onegesius
 Bleda
 Mundzuk

Notes

Sources

External links 

 
 Works about Attila at Project Gutenberg
 
 

 
5th-century Hunnic rulers
5th-century monarchs in Europe
406 births
453 deaths
Deaths from choking
Genocide perpetrators